In mathematics, a function  is weakly harmonic in a domain  if  

This is the same notion as a weak derivative, however, a function can have a weak derivative and not be differentiable. In this case, we have the somewhat surprising result that a function is weakly harmonic if and only if it is harmonic. Thus weakly harmonic is actually equivalent to the seemingly stronger harmonic condition.

See also
 Weak solution
 Weyl's lemma

Harmonic functions